Father Martial Jean Baptiste Paillot (born 1855 or 1856; died September 16, 1930) was a French Roman Catholic missionary, history professor and parish priest. He served as a missionary in Pondicherry for 44 years.

Early life
Paillot was born in Ménil sur Saulx, France, the second in a family of ten children (four of whom died at a young age). (Sources differ as to his date of birth, either 1855 or 1856 are given). Little is known about his youth. His younger brother described him as very studious, sporty, with a combative nature.

He studied at the Minor and Major Seminary in Verdun, where he was a brilliant student. He was ordained as a priest on June 30, 1881.

He worked as a history professor at the Minor Seminary in Verdun for two years, then became a vicar in Montmédy. During this time, he discovered his calling as a missionary; he entered the Foreign Missions Seminary (Séminaire des Missions Étrangères) in Paris in 1885. He would spend only a year there before he was posted to the mission in Pondicherry, India.

After announcing his posting, he went to say his farewells to his family members. They were filled with grief when he announced he was leaving forever; coming from Father Paillot, it was an irrevocable decision. He stayed true to his words as the 44 years between his departure from France and his death were all spent in India. The first years of his mandate were difficult, as he lost both a brother and his mother.

Life in India
He arrived in Pondicherry in 1886 and was named the vicar of the Our Lady of Angels Church in July 1887. He was temporarily assigned to the Colonial College in 1894 while its director returned to France due to health concerns; when the director returned in 1885, Father Paillot returned to Our Lady of Angels. However, he developed malarial fever, which put his life in danger, necessitating a change in climate.
 
He was sent to the mountains of Ceylon. Working in Kandy as secretary for Mgr. Zaleski, the apostolic delegate in India, his health slowly returned. As he got better, he followed the Monsignor to his various apostolic wanderings in India for about a year. He returned to Pondicherry in 1926, again serving as vicar at Our Lady of Angels. When the parish priest retired, he took over the position; “In spite of his 71 years, he was the good shepherd, catechising, preaching, going to visit his parishioners, bringing comfort to the sick, offering himself fully to all, to win them for Jesus Christ.”

Final years
Starting in 1929, his health began to decline. He suffered from frequent malaise and vomiting, with an old lymphangitis worsening and his legs weakening. He was sent to Saint Martha’s Hospital in Bangalore on August 23, 1930. He only spent a few weeks in the hospital before dying on September 16. He spent his final weeks “far from his dear parishioners, who did not hesitate to pray for the saintly priest”. An article in La Croix on November 26, 1931, introduced him to the French public.  The article in question bears this sensational title: “The body of a French missionary is found intact after a long stay in the ground, exactly from September 16, 1930, to October 18, 1931”. It mentions that he was buried in Bangalore and had a grandiose and touching funeral in Pondicherry.

The article also mentions that when his body was exhumed, the people present expected to find nothing but bones; they slowly dug with shovels until hitting the soft coffin that had been eaten by termites. Digging by hand, they arrived at the body with its shoulders slightly arched. After another 15 minutes of digging, they were able to lower a rope around a board under the body that hadn’t been ravaged by the termites. The body was left out in the sun, with three religious sisters doing their best to remove dirt from the face; the nose and eyes were somewhat damaged. The coolies present were somewhat less delicate, removing pieces from his priestly robes. It was noted, however, that the body was not terribly damaged and that the skin had taken a coppery hue. There was very little odor from the body. His body was taken by train from Bangalore Sunday night, arriving in Pondicherry the next day, October 19. He was taken to his former parish church where he was given a funeral with the governor and his wife, the mayor and many others in attendance. He was then buried at the church.

Notes

Year of birth uncertain
1850s births
1930 deaths
French Roman Catholic missionaries
Roman Catholic missionaries in India